Not to be confused with Bhushan Power & Steel, another company promoted by the same family.

Tata Steel BSL Limited, formerly known as Bhushan Steel Limited, was the largest manufacturer of auto-grade steel in India. Tata Steel BSL Limited, with an amount of debt in proportion to its equity (0.5 times more). The company's consolidated debt stands at ₹10,686 crore. The company was spending Rs. 260 billion to expand its capacity to 12 million tonnes annually, from the present installed capacity of around one million tonnes.

Insolvency proceedings were initiated against the former company on 26 July 2017 under the Insolvency and Bankruptcy Code, 2016. On 27 November 2018 the company was renamed as Tata Steel BSL Limited from Bhushan Steel Limited.

This company is distinct from Bhushan Power & Steel (with Sanjay Singal as Chairman & Managing Director). with major claims by creditors against it, including the Punjab National Bank.

In April 2019, the Tata Steel board approved the merger of Bamnipal Steel and Tata Steel BSL (formerly Bhushan Steel Ltd) with itself.

Financial Management
Gross sales of Tata Steel BSL grew from Rs. 5 billion in 2001 to Rs. 40  billion in 2007. It earned net profits of Rs. 3.13 billion in 2007 and exported goods worth Rs. 12.57 billion. Its exports include steel for both the automotive and white goods industry and the list of countries to which it exports includes several developed countries.

Rajeev Singhal is the managing director of Tata Steel BSL Limited.

The Khopoli plant in Maharashtra was commissioned in 2004 and has been producing colour-coated sheets, high-tensile steel strappings, hardened and tempered steel strips for the first time in India, along with CRCA steel to cater to the needs of the automobile industry.

At its Sahibabad plant in Ghaziabad, Uttar Pradesh, it has a 1700 mm mill, which produces the widest sheets in India for the automotive industry. It has highly automated systems.

At its Meramandali, Dhenkanal plant in Odisha, Tata Steel BSL produces hot rolled coils and has mills for hot rolling. Construction of the first phase is being carried out.

References

Steel companies of India
Companies based in New Delhi
Manufacturing companies based in Delhi
Manufacturing companies established in 1987
1987 establishments in Delhi
Indian companies established in 1987
Companies listed on the National Stock Exchange of India
Companies listed on the Bombay Stock Exchange